Five Oak Green is a village near Tonbridge, Kent in the Civil Parish of Capel. 

The village was a centre for hop growing. In the 19th century, The Rose and Crown public house was converted to a hospital to treat the many hop pickers who resided in the village and its surroundings in the late summer. The public house was renamed "The Little Hoppers' Hospital" by a London priest, Richard Wilson,  who added to the house's sign "No beer sold here", so no one should have any doubt of its changed role. 

The village oast house, the Moat Farm Oast, has been converted and now houses a number of businesses.

External links

Capel History Group website

Villages in Kent